Sarah-Jane Potts (born 30 August 1976) is an English actress, best known for her roles as Saint (Sarah) in Sugar Rush, Ellie, Abs' on/off girlfriend in Casualty and Jo Lipsett in Waterloo Road. Potts is the sister of actor Andrew-Lee Potts. From 2011 to 2012, she appeared in Holby City as Senior Nurse Eddi McKee on AAU, playing a different character to the one she played in Casualty. Potts left Holby City in the second episode of Series 15; her departure was kept a secret by the production team and was not reported at all by the media, resulting in a shock exit for her character.

Early in her career she noted that, "In the three years I have been acting I have spent most of the time looking dirty, scruffy, ill or tarty."

Personal life
Potts attended Bradford's Scala Kids stage school with her brother Andrew. As a teenager she worked in a greasy spoon cafe in Bradford. She left school during her A-levels to star in Meat. From 1999 to 2001, she dated Erik Palladino. They met at a film festival in Sweden during the summer of 1999 and at the end of the year she moved to Los Angeles to live with him. She met her former husband, Tony Denman, when filming National Lampoon's Barely Legal and they were married in June 2002. She has a son, named Buster Alan Denman, born 2004. She met her second husband, Joseph Millson, while working together on the medical drama Holby City and married him on 31 December 2013.

Filmography

References

External links

1976 births
Living people
English television actresses
English film actresses
Actresses from Bradford
20th-century English actresses
21st-century English actresses